Goodenia glandulosa  is a species of flowering plant in the family Goodeniaceae and is endemic to dry, inland areas of Australia. It is an erect, perennial herb with linear to lance-shaped leaves and racemes of yellow flowers.

Description
Flowering mainly occurs from July to October and the fruit is a more or less spherical capsule  in diameter.

Taxonomy and naming
Goodenia glandulosa was first formally described in 1912 by Kurt Krause in Adolf Engler's journal Das Pflanzenreich from material collected in 1891. The specific epithet (glandulosa) means "gland-bearing", referring to the glandular hairs on the foliage.

Distribution and habitat
This goodenia grows in dry, inland areas, usually on rocky hillsides in Western Australia and in South Australia, but on sand dunes in a few locations in the Northern Territory.

Conservation status
Goodenia glandulosa is classified as "not threatened" by the Government of Western Australia Department of Parks and Wildlife but as "near threatened" under the Northern Territory Government Territory Parks and Wildlife Conservation Act 1976.

References

glandulosa
Eudicots of Western Australia
Plants described in 1912
Flora of the Northern Territory
Flora of South Australia
Endemic flora of Australia